Planorbis kahuica is a species of minute, air-breathing freshwater snail, an aquatic pulmonate gastropod mollusk or micromollusk in the family Planorbidae, the ram's horn snails, or planorbids. All planorbids have sinistral shells

Etymology
The species name kahuica is derived from "Kahu", a Māori personal name, and was part of the tribal name of the principal Māori tribe in the Hawke's Bay district of New Zealand.

Description 
The shell is sinistral and planispiral.

References

Planorbidae
Gastropods described in 1931
Freshwater molluscs of Oceania
Taxa named by Harold John Finlay